The Garcia-Reynoso was a revolver of Argentine origin, developed by captain Antonio García Reynoso. The weapon was chambered in the 7.8x30mm Reynoso round and featured automatic ejection.

The design was then acquired from Leige and further developed by Henri Pieper. Pieper then obtained a German patent, number 81930 of 27 May 1894.

References

Further reading
 Egon Neumann, "Revolver mit Magazinladung", Schuss und Waffe 1913/9.

External links
 
 

Revolvers
Firearms of Argentina